is a one-shot Japanese manga written and illustrated by Yaya Sakuragi. It was serialised in Biblos's Magazine Be x Boy. It is licensed in North America by Digital Manga Publishing, which released the manga through its imprint, Juné, on April 22, 2009. The manga is licensed in Germany as Lieber Lehrer... by Carlson Comics. Biblos released the manga on April 10, 2007.

Reception
Rachel Bentham commends that the manga is "a seductively sweet romance about a taboo love in the halls of high school!" Leroy Douresseaux commends the author for her illustrations saying, "Sakuragi skillful page design and pretty sequential art make Hey, Sensei? a better-than-average read; if only, the story was as catchy as the visuals". Melinda Beasi commends the manga's art saying, "Yaya Sakuragi’s art is also a highlight. Her faces are expressive (both in the main feature and in the short extra story, “Unbreakable Bones”) and her lanky character designs help to alleviate worries about the age difference between Isa and Homura as well, as Homura's body is unambiguously adult".

References

2007 manga
Drama anime and manga
Digital Manga Publishing titles
Josei manga
Yaoi anime and manga